"Welcome to America" is a song by the American industrial rock group Die Warzau. It is the second single released in support of their debut album Disco Rigido.

Formats and track listing 
All songs written by Van Christie and Jim Marcus
US 12" single (889 899-1)
"Welcome to America" – 4:18
"Welcome to America" (Remix) – 5:50
"Welcome to America" (Hip Hop Mix) – 5:16
"Welcome to America" (Hip Hop Dub) – 2:42

Charts

Personnel
Adapted from the Welcome to America liner notes.

Die Warzau
 Van Christie – guitar, synthesizer, sampler, computer, production, editing
 Jim Marcus – lead vocals, saxophone, percussion, noises, production

Additional performers
 Jennifer Wilcox – additional vocals

Production and design
 Tom Coyne – mastering
 Steve Spapperi – production

Release history

References

External links 
 

1989 songs
1989 singles
Die Warzau songs
Fiction Records singles
PolyGram singles